Ryabinovka is a rural locality (a selo) in Gubkinsky District, Belgorod Oblast, Russia. The population was 65 as of 2010. There are four streets.

Geography 
Ryabinovka is located 33 km southeast of Gubkin (the district's administrative centre) by road. Uspenka is the nearest rural locality.

References 

Rural localities in Gubkinsky District